The EMD G22 Series were first introduced in 1968 to replace the popular G12 along with various improvements. They carried a low per axle weight on their Flexicoil Type-GC trucks and were the first model series to have a low nose as a standard option as well.

The G22 series now carried a U or W suffix after the model designation to indicate the type of traction motors. A C indicated six axle trucks, while a 4 indicated A-1-A- trucks; although there never has been an indication of four axle A-1-A trucks until 1993.

The designations could apply to any kind of export locomotive design of EMD or another licensee of EMD as long as the electrical & mechanical gear was left unaltered.

Overview 
With the introduction of the 645 engine for export models in 1967, the model designation numbers changed by adding 10. To meet customer demands of a six axle version of the popular G12, EMD created the GR12 which was slightly longer and taller to accommodate the six axle Type-GC trucks.

Although the orders lacked for the GR12 due to the weight and size of the locomotive, EMD revised and designed the lighter G22 series model to accommodate the Flexicoil Type-C truck and introducing the new EMD 645 series engine. With relocation of the batteries within the carbody and increasing the fuel tank capacity, the G22C series was the same length to that of its four axle counterpart, the G22. Production spanned longer than the four axle G22 version, but with smaller orders.

Several models were introduced:

G22CW
G22CU
G22CU-2
GL22C
GL22C-2

G22CW

The EMD G22CW was first introduced in 1969.  Unlike its predecessor GR12, the G22CW now carried a CW suffix which indicated that this model had six axles (C) and traction motors that could fit from standard gauge rails to  gauge rails (W).

The G22CW found most of its popularity in Argentina and Sri Lanka, as the largest order were each placed by them with 15 units.

Production spanned from July 1976 to November 1990

G22CU

The EMD G22CU first appeared in 1969. Designed mainly for the narrow gauge market, the G22CU now carried a CU suffix which indicated that this model had six axles (C) and traction motors that could fit from one meter gauge to 5 ft 6 in gauge rails (U).

The G22CU found most of its popularity in Pakistan, as older locomotives were being replaced.

Production spanned from February 1969 to June 1982.

G22CU-2
Beginning on January 1, 1972, export locomotives now had the option to carry EMD Dash 2 electronics, adding the (-2) suffix to the locomotive model. Only Argentina and Taiwan purchased the G22CU-2.

Production spanned from March 1992 to August 2001

GL22C
When most second and third world railroads couldn't operate standard EMD Locomotives due to their weight, EMD introduced the L suffix which indicated the locomotive had a lightweight frame. The locomotive designation was now changed to GL22C. However, as these locomotives had a much lighter frame, the application of the U or W suffixes no longer applied.

Production spanned from December 1971 to May 1977

GL22C-2
Being the rarest of the G22C series, the GL22C-2 model combined a lightweight frame and the new EMD Dash 2 electronics.

Production was only for Queensland Rail, who were the sole purchaser.

GL22MC
 New Zealand DF Class 30
 Togo Rail S.A CC class 1651 to 1653.

Phasing
Only two general variations have been noticed during the G22C production.

Phase 1: Larger frame sill, air reservoir slung under skirting.

Phase 2: Smaller frame sill, air reservoir exposed, and two horizontal bars along intake grilles.

There have been various as-modifications on railroads as well, but are excluded due to various degrees of completion on the modification.

Models
The G22CU/G22CW model is represented in HO Scale by Frateschi trains of Brazil. Due to the accommodation of the motor, the model is not entirely accurate.

See also 
List of GM-EMD locomotives
List of GMD Locomotives
EMD G22CU
Brazilian Miracle
RFFSA
ASTARSA

Sources 
Electro-Motive Division Export GM Models
Astilleros Argentinos Rio de la Plata S.A. GM Export Models
Material Y Construcciones S.A. GM Export Models
Henschel und Sohn GmbH GM Export Models
Equipamentos Villares S.A. GM Export Models
General Motors Diesel Division Export Models
Frateschi G22CU HO Scale Model
GM G22CU Data Sheet 
EMD G22CU Article in Portuguese

C-C locomotives
Export locomotives
Diesel-electric locomotives of Argentina
Diesel-electric locomotives of Brazil
Diesel-electric locomotives of Guinea
Diesel-electric locomotives of Liberia
Diesel-electric locomotives of Morocco
Diesel-electric locomotives of Mali
Diesel-electric locomotives of Nigeria
Diesel-electric locomotives of Pakistan
Diesel-electric locomotives of Peru
Diesel-electric locomotives of Senegal
Diesel-electric locomotives of Sri Lanka
Diesel-electric locomotives of Taiwan
Railway locomotives introduced in 1968
G22C
3 ft 6 in gauge locomotives
Standard gauge railway locomotives